Prof. F. O. Kwami Ph.D was a Ghanaian academic and a former Vice Chancellor of the Kwame Nkrumah University of Science and Technology.

Term as Vice Chancellor
Prof. F.O. Kwami served as Vice Chancellor of KNUST from 1984 to 1992.

References

Academic staff of Kwame Nkrumah University of Science and Technology
Living people
Vice-Chancellors of the Kwame Nkrumah University of Science and Technology
Year of birth missing (living people)
Vice-Chancellors of universities in Ghana